This is a list of notable events in country music that took place in the year 1933.

Events 
sales grew approximately 15% over 1932

Top Hillbilly (Country) Recordings

The following songs were extracted from records included in Joel Whitburn's Pop Memories 1890-1954, record sales reported on the "Discography of American Historical Recordings" website, and other sources as specified. Numerical rankings are approximate, they are only used as a frame of reference.

Births 
 March 10 – Ralph Emery, radio and television personality.
 April 15 – Roy Clark, singer and multi-instrumentalist, host of television's Hee Haw (died 2018).
 April 30 – Willie Nelson, songwriter and key member of the 1970s "outlaw" movement.
 September 1 – Conway Twitty, singer-songwriter who successfully defected from 1950s rock music career to become a giant in the country genre from the 1960s through the early 1990s (died 1993).
 September 3 – Tompall Glaser, member of Tompall & the Glaser Brothers and leading member of the 1970s "outlaw" movement (died 2013).
 October 27 – Floyd Cramer, session pianist who had a series of hits in his own right (died 1997).
 November 21 – Jean Shepard, legendary female vocalist of the 1950s–1970s and a longtime Grand Ole Opry favorite (died 2016).

Deaths 
 May 26 – Jimmie Rodgers, 35, "The Singing Brakeman" who became country music's first bona fide superstar (tuberculosis).

Further reading 
 Kingsbury, Paul, "Vinyl Hayride: Country Music Album Covers 1947–1989," Country Music Foundation, 2003
 Millard, Bob, "Country Music: 70 Years of America's Favorite Music," HarperCollins, New York, 1993
 Whitburn, Joel. "Top Country Songs 1944–2005 – 6th Edition." 2005.

References

Country
Country music by year